Allan Pettersson wrote his Symphony No. 9 in 1970.

History
The symphony is his last composition preceding a nine-month stay in Karolinska Hospital in Stockholm (starting September 1970); Pettersson composed the symphony in less than half a year.

Structure
It is Pettersson's longest symphony with a duration of ca. 70–85 minutes (score: 65–70 minutes). There is one movement, though it divides into a number of smaller sections that follow each other with at most nominal pause but usually none.

Music
Much though not all of the material in the symphony is based on the ascending (and later descending) chromatic scale motif heard at the very beginning, played by bassoons, violas and cellos. Additional material is a repeated-note figure. Pettersson juxtaposes innocent, diatonic melodies with passages of great contrapuntal ferocity. There are sections of tango and canon and also a quotation of Song No. 10 "Jungfrun och Ljugarpust" (The Maiden and the Lying Wind) from his Barefoot Songs. The Ninth can be described as an extended struggle in which harmony is the ultimate winner. The concluding bars of the symphony consist of a long final melody (in Peter Ruzicka's terms: a "Canto") played by violins and cellos and later by the violas in unison, and ends in a slow peaceful plagal cadence into F major.

Paul Rapoport uses adjectives like vast, nightmarish and delirious to characterize the symphony. The symphony is a natural, organic unity and demanding for musicians and listeners.

Performances
Pettersson dedicated the symphony to Sergiu Comissiona and the Gothenburg Symphony, who premiered it on 18 February 1971 and had commissioned it for the 350th Anniversary of the Founding of the City of Gothenburg. It was played again in December 1974, and the first Stockholm performances were given on 25 and 26 May 1976. Comissiona described later the Ninth as "Jupiter" among Pettersson's symphonies.

Score
The miniature score was published in 1989 by Nordiska Musikforlaget of Stockholm and runs to 385 pages and 2146 bars.

Recordings
 Sergiu Comissiona, conductor, Gothenburg Symphony; on Philips 2-LP set 6767 951, 1978. 
 Alun Francis, conductor, Deutsches Symphonie-Orchester Berlin; on cpo 999 231–2, 1994. 
 Christian Lindberg, conductor, Norrköping Symphony Orchestra; on BIS 2038, 2013.

Notes

References

Further reading
 

Compositions by Allan Pettersson
1970 compositions
Pettersson 9
Music commissioned by the Gothenburg Symphony Orchestra